Chakka Bahadur Lama (born Tsewang Lama ) is a Nepalese politician belonging to CPN (UML). He had previously served as a member of parliament in the 2nd House of Representatives and the 1st Federal Parliament for Humla 1.

Early life and education 
Chakka Bahadur Lama was born in Bargaun in Humla District on 25 April 1959 to Takpa Tsyoden Lama and Nagderma Lama. His father, Takpa, was a Nyingmapa Lama and also the village physician. He has five brothers and three sisters. He completed his bachelor's degree in law and master's degree in sociology and anthropology from Tribhuvan University.

Political career 
In 1981 he became a central committee member of the All Nepal National Free Students Union (Sixth), the student union of CPN (Masal). He became the District in-charge for Humla District for CPN (Masal) in 1985. In the 1991 general elections, he was elected to the House of Representatives from Humla 1 for the electoral front of CPN (Unity Centre), Samyukta Janamorcha Nepal of which he was a central committee member. He won the elections by 8 votes. After the end of his term in 1994, he did not contest the mid-term elections and managed the Humla Conservation and Development Committee, a non-governmental organisation. In 2005 he was appointed as a state minister for Local Development in the cabinet appointed by King Gyanendra.

He rejoined the CPN (Maoist) at the start of the peace process in 2006 as a central committee member. He contested in the 2nd Constituent Assembly elections in 2013 for the Unified CPN (Maoist) but lost the elections. He stood in the 2017 general elections as an independent from Humla 1 and won the elections by 47 votes. He was a politburo member of the CPN (Maoist Centre) at the time and the party suspended him for contesting against the candidate of the left alliance. He served as a member of the State Management and Good Governance Committee of the 5th House of Representatives.

He joined CPN (UML) on 3 October 2022 and contested the 2022 provincial elections for Karnali from Humla 1 (B), but lost to incumbent chief minister Jeevan Bahadur Shahi by a margin of over 4,000 votes.

Personal life 
Lama is married to Rikjan Lama. His daughter was part of the People's Liberation Army during the Nepalese Civil War and was killed in Mugu District during the war. Lama is multilingual and knows five languages.

He was awarded the Provincial Talent Award for Karnali Province for contributions to literature in cultural research on the occasion of 206th Bhanu Jayanti, the birth anniversary of Bhanu Bhakta Acharya, a poet of Nepali language.

Electoral history

Publications 

 2002 Kailash Mandala: A Pilgrim's Trekking Guide

References

Living people
Nepal MPs 2017–2022
Nepal MPs 1991–1994
Communist Party of Nepal (Maoist Centre) politicians
1957 births
People from Humla District
Communist Party of Nepal (Unified Marxist–Leninist) politicians